Accrington Library is a Carnegie library located in the town of Accrington, Lancashire.

In 1904 a sum of £7,500 was offered to the town by the industrialist and philanthropist Andrew Carnegie for the building of a new library. Following an application for more funds this offer was increased to £10,000. The building itself was opened in January 1908. It was managed by Accrington Council until 1974 when this role was taken on by Lancashire County Council.

The development, opening and early years of the building 
The Public Library Acts were adopted during a meeting of the Town Council on 5 June 1899 following a bequest of £500 by Mr John Edgar Stansfield. The first Library Committee was appointed on 9 November of that year. The Lending Library was opened in part of the building occupied by the Directors of the Mechanics' Institution.

Andrew Carnegie's offer of £7,500 of funding for a new library came in 1904 following representations made to him, and this was increased to £10,000. The building, built and designed by the Borough Engineer William Newton, was opened on 18 January 1908 by Alderman T. E. Higham. The ground floor contained a reading room, children's room and lending department; the first floor housed the reference library, librarian's office and a lecture Room  which could hold 500 people. Several gifts of books had been made including the 4,000 volume library of William Ashworth and the Mechanics' Institution Library of 5,000 volumes.

A souvenir brochure was produced to commemorate the opening of the library, which explained that the 'Safe guarded open access' system used in the previous library premises was to be maintained and that there were 11,000 volumes available to the public in the lending library as well as 2,000 volumes in the children's library. The library also worked with the Blind Society to provide volumes, presumably in Braille. It was acknowledged that there was a weakness in reference provision but it was hoped that the Library Committee would allocate enough funds each year to rectify this. The brochure details the design features, including the large stained glass window by H. Gustave Hiller of Liverpool "which has been designed not only to be effective as a work of art but also to give light to the building".

References

Public libraries in Lancashire
Carnegie libraries in England